Epipsestis witti is a moth in the family Drepanidae. It is found in Nepal, Tibet in China, India, Vietnam and Thailand.

References

Moths described in 2007
Thyatirinae